Argyrotaenia potosiana is a species of moth of the family Tortricidae. It is found in Nuevo León, Mexico.

The wingspan is about 19 mm. The ground colour of the forewings is cream, tinged with yellowish along the costa. The hindwings are cream white.

Etymology
The species name refers to Cerro Potosí, the type locality.

References

P
Endemic Lepidoptera of Mexico
Moths described in 2010